In linguistics and rhetoric, the historical present or historic present, also called dramatic present or narrative present, is the employment of the present tense when narrating past events. It is widely used in writing about history in Latin (where it is sometimes referred to by its Latin name, praesens historicum) and some modern European languages. In English, it is used above all in historical chronicles (listing a series of events). It is also used in fiction, for "hot news" (as in headlines), and in everyday conversation. In conversation, it is particularly common with quotative verbs such as say and go, and especially the newer quotative like. It is typically thought to heighten the dramatic force of the narrative by describing events as if they were still unfolding, and/or by foregrounding some events relative to others.

Examples
In an excerpt from Charles Dickens's David Copperfield, the shift from the past tense to the historical present gives a sense of immediacy, as of a recurring vision:

Novels that are written entirely in the historical present include notably John Updike's Rabbit, Run, Hilary Mantel's Wolf Hall and Margaret Atwood's The Handmaid's Tale.

In describing fiction
Summaries of the narratives (plots) of works of fiction are conventionally presented using the present tense, rather than the past tense. At any particular point of the story, as it unfolds, there is a now and so a past and a future, so whether some event mentioned in the story is past, present, or, future changes as the story progresses. The entire plot description is presented as if the story's now were a continuous present. Thus, in summarizing the plot of A Tale of Two Cities, one may write:

In other languages
In French, the historical present is often used in journalism and in historical texts to report events in the past.

The extinct language Shasta appeared to allow the historical present in narratives.

The New Testament, written in Koine Greek in the 1st century CE, is notable for use of the historical present, particularly in the Gospel of Mark.

See also

 Future tense
 Grammatical tense
 Past tense 
 Passé simple – the historical past in French
 Preterite
 Uses of English verb forms

Sources

References

Grammatical tenses
Rhetorical techniques
Narrative techniques